Morbid Saint is an American thrash metal band from Sheboygan, Wisconsin. The band is known for being a regular opening act for Florida's Death, one of the progenitors of death metal, as confirmed by Jay Visser, as well as having an influence in the genres of blackened thrash and death metal.

After splitting up about half a decade following the release of their debut album Spectrum of Death (1989), Morbid Saint reunited in 2010 and released their first album in 26 years, Destruction System, in 2015. They are currently working on a third album.

Biography 
Morbid Saint was formed on November 1, 1984 in Sheboygan, Wisconsin. The band debuted a demo in 1988 titled Lock Up Your Children, licensed by Edge Entertainment to Mexican label Avanzada Metálica, who reissued it as a full-length album in 1989 under the title Spectrum of Death; however, it was not released other territories until years later. In 1992, they released a fan-exclusive demo titled Destruction System as an advance cassette for a planned second full-length, but never was officially released in latter form. A single-sided demo titled The Black Tape was released later that year containing only four tracks from the Destruction System demo. The band then split-up in 1994.

In early 2010, Morbid Saint announced their reunion with a new line-up, performing various shows in the U.S. and abroad, including the 2012 edition of Maryland Deathfest, Metal on the Rocks in Mexico City and the 2013 edition of the Keep It True festival in Germany. In 2012, the band released the compilation album Thrashaholic, containing both Spectrum of Death and Destruction System in remastered CD-R format, with four new songs and a live DVD in DVD-R format.

In 2014, the band released the live album Beyond the States of Hell, which was recorded live from Beijing. In November 2015, Destruction System was officially released as the band's second full-length album that was originally intended for release in 1992, but went unfinished since then, with new artwork.

Morbid Saint is currently writing new material for their third album, which is planned for release in 2023.

Band members 
Current members
Jay Visser – guitar 
Jim Fergades – guitar 
Pat Lind – vocals 
Bob Zabel – bass 
DJ Bagemehl – drums 

Former members
Lee Reynolds – drums 
Mike Chapa – vocals, bass 
Tony Paletti – bass 
Bob Sinjakovic – vocals 
Gary Beimel – bass 
Chris Jacobs – drums 
Randy Wall – drums 
Kevin Koski – guitar 
Marco Martell – guitar 
Cliff Wagner – vocals 
Martin Russell Gesch – guitar 

Timeline

Discography 
Studio albums
Spectrum of Death (1989)
Destruction System (2015)

Live albums
Beyond the States of Hell (2014)

Demos
Lock up Your Children (1988)
Destruction System (1992)

References 

https://www.metal-archives.com/bands/Morbid_Saint/8939

External links 

American thrash metal musical groups
Heavy metal musical groups from Wisconsin
Musical groups established in 1986
Musical groups disestablished in 1994
1986 establishments in Wisconsin